The 2015 AMA National Speedway Championship Series was staged over four rounds, which were held at Costa Mesa (May 30), Ventura (June 27), Industry (August 8) and Auburn (September 18). Billy Janniro took the title, his sixth in total, winning two of the four rounds.

Event format 
Over the course of 20 heats, each rider raced against every other rider once. The top eight scorers then reached the semi-finals, with first and second in those semi-finals reaching the final. Points were scored for every ride taken, including the semi-finals and final.

Classification

References 

AMA
United States
Speed
Speed